Jonathan Asake is a Nigerian politician and former lawmaker. He is a candidate in the 2023 Kaduna State gubernatorial election under the Labour Party. Prior to his nomination as gubernatorial candidate, he served as the president of President of Southern Kaduna Peoples Union (SOKAPU)

In an interview granted him by Channels Television’s, Sunrise Daily, he clarified that Labour Party on whose platform he runs is not a Southern Kaduna People's agenda. In his words, “The Labour Party is not a southern people’s agenda, it is an expression of hope for people that felt that they have been left out, we have campaigned across the local government and indeed the teeming masses in all the local government have felt that they have been left out”.

References 

Nigerian politicians
Nigerian political candidates